"The Battle Hymn of the Republic, Updated" (otherwise known as "The Battle Hymn of the Republic (Brought Down to Date)") was written in 1900 by Mark Twain, as a parody of American imperialism, in the wake of the Philippine–American War.  It is written in the same tune and cadence as the original "Battle Hymn of the Republic" by Julia Ward Howe. The poem remained unpublished in Twain's lifetime and did not appear in print until 1958.

A recording was made by the Chad Mitchell Trio as "The Battle Hymn of the Republic Brought Down to Date". The lyrics were slightly modified and the verse about prostitution excised, and the first four lines from the Marines' Hymn sung over one of the choruses.

Lyrics

Footnote

The footnote in the lyrics contained the following text:

"* NOTE: In Manila the Government has placed a certain industry under the protection of our flag. (M.T.)"

See also
List of anti-war songs
Battle Hymn of the Republic

References

External links
Sacred Texts website
Origins of a Civil War Song

Works by Mark Twain
Philippine–American War
1901 songs